The 2016–17 Liga I (also known as Liga 1 Betano for sponsorship reasons) was the 99th season of the Liga I, the top professional league for Romanian association football clubs. The season began on 22 July 2016 and concluded on 5 June 2017, being the second to take place since the play-off/play-out format has been introduced. Viitorul Constanța were crowned champions for the first time in their history.

Teams
The last two teams from the 2015–16 season, ACS Poli Timișoara and Petrolul Ploiești, were relegated to their respective 2016–17 Liga II division. The first team from each of the two divisions of 2015–16 Liga II advanced to Liga I.

On 21 July 2016 Rapid București was excluded from Liga I after the club went into dissolution. Their place was taken by ACS Poli Timișoara.

Renamed teams
CSM Studențesc Iași was renamed as CSM Politehnica Iași.FC Steaua București was renamed as FCSB.

Venues

Personnel and kits

Note: Flags indicate national team as has been defined under FIFA eligibility rules. Players and Managers may hold more than one non-FIFA nationality.

Managerial changes

Regular season
In the regular season the 14 teams will meet twice, a total of 26 matches per team, with the top 6 advancing to the Championship round and the bottom 8 qualifying for Relegation round.

Table

Results

Positions by round

Championship play-offs
The top six teams from Regular season will meet twice (10 matches per team) for places in 2017–18 UEFA Champions League and 2017–18 UEFA Europa League as well as deciding the league champion. Teams start the Championship round with their points from the Regular season halved, rounded upwards, and no other records carried over from the Regular season.

Table

Results

Positions by round

Relegation play-outs
The bottom eight teams from regular season will meet twice (14 matches per team) to contest against relegation. Teams start the Relegation round with their points from the Regular season halved, rounded upwards, and no other records carried over from the Regular season. The winner of the Relegation round finishes 7th in the overall season standings, the second placed team - 8th, and so on, with the last placed team in the Relegation round being 14th.

Table

Results

Positions by round

Promotion/relegation play-offs
The 12th-placed team of the Liga I faced the 3rd-placed team of the Liga II.

Notes:
 ACS Poli Timișoara qualified for 2017–18 Liga I and UTA Arad qualified for 2017–18 Liga II.

Season statistics

Top scorers
Updated to matches played on 5 June 2017.

1 Azdren Llullaku was transferred to Astana during the winter transfer window.
2 Mircea Axente was transferred to Al-Faisaly during the winter transfer window.

Hat-tricks

Clean sheets
Updated to matches played on 5 June 2017.

*Only goalkeepers who played all 90 minutes of a match are taken into consideration.

Discipline
As of 5 June 2017

Player
Most yellow cards: 12
 Andrei Artean (ACS Poli Timișoara)
 Júnior Morais (Astra Giurgiu)
 Gabriel Vașvari (Botoșani)
 Daniel Novac (Voluntari)
Most red cards: 3
 George Miron (Botoșani)
 Radu Zaharia (Gaz Metan Mediaș)

Club
Most yellow cards: 104
Astra Giurgiu
Concordia Chiajna
Pandurii Târgu Jiu

Most red cards: 8
Politehnica Iași
Botoșani

Champion squad

Awards

Liga I Team of the Season

Monthly awards

Notes

References

External links
 

2016-17
2016–17 in Romanian football
ro